Perry County is in Illinois. According to the 2010 census, it had a population of 22,350. Its county seat is Pinckneyville. It is located in the southern portion of Illinois known as "Little Egypt".

History
Perry County was formed in 1827 out of Jackson and Randolph counties. It was named in honor of Oliver Hazard Perry who defeated the British fleet at the decisive Battle of Lake Erie in the War of 1812.

In its early history, Perry County was mainly an inland pioneer outpost.  Early settlers, including some Revolutionary War veterans bearing land grants, moved here from the Eastern United States.  These were primarily Protestant settlers.  Growth boomed in the 1850s for two reasons:  construction of the Illinois Central Railroad through the eastern portion of the county, and the discovery of large coal reserves.  Immigrants from Ireland, Poland, Germany, Italy and elsewhere steadily increased the County's population from 1850 through the 1920s.  African Americans also were established in the County during northward migration following the Civil War.

Mining continued to be the dominant employment sector through the 1990s.

Geography

Perry County is located in Southern Illinois.

The County's topography is mainly flat with some rolling hills.  The part of the County's eastern border, the part shared with Franklin County, is formed by the Little Muddy River.  Beaucoup Creek runs north to south through the County and lies just east of Pinckneyville.

The county's topography also features many "strip cut" lakes, lakes left behind following above-ground coal mining.  Lakes at two of the county's chief recreation areas, the Du Quoin State Fairgrounds and Pyramid State Recreation Area, were formed this way.

Climate and weather

Major highways
  U.S. Route 51
  Illinois Route 4
  Illinois Route 13
  Illinois Route 14
  Illinois Route 127
  Illinois Route 150
  Illinois Route 152
  Illinois Route 154

Adjacent counties
 Washington County - north
 Jefferson County - northeast
 Franklin County - east
 Jackson County - south
 Randolph County - west

Demographics

As of the 2010 United States Census, there were 22,350 people, 8,335 households, and 5,622 families residing in the county. The racial makeup of the county was 87.9% white, 8.3% black or African American, 0.4% Asian, 0.2% American Indian, 1.6% from other races, and 1.4% from two or more races. Those of Hispanic or Latino origin made up 2.7% of the population. In terms of ancestry, 32.8% were German, 14.3% were Irish, 10.6% were English, 8.1% were American, and 6.3% were Polish.

Of the 8,335 households, 30.4% had children under the age of 18 living with them, 51.5% were married couples living together, 11.3% had a female householder with no husband present, 32.5% were non-families, and 28.6% of all households were made up of individuals. The average household size was 2.38 and the average family size was 2.90. The median age was 39.4 years.

The median income for a household in the county was $40,696 and the median income for a family was $50,130. Males had a median income of $40,768 versus $28,377 for females. The per capita income for the county was $17,926. About 11.5% of families and 14.0% of the population were below the poverty line, including 22.6% of those under age 18 and 6.9% of those age 65 or over.

Communities
Perry County never adopted a township form of government. Federal township plats were prepared for each township which include legal descriptions of 14 townships.

Perry County has been divided into precincts: Beaucoup, Cutler, Denmark, DuQuoin, Paradise, Pinckneyville, Sunfield, Swanwick, Tamaroa and Willisville. To provide election precincts of similar population based on recent census data, precincts are divided or combined to form election precincts. The election precincts in 2020 were: Beaucoup, Cutler, Du Quoin Number 1, Du Quoin Number 2, Du Quoin Number 3, Du Quoin Number 4, Du Quoin Number 5, Du Quoin Number 6, Du Quoin Number 7, Du Quoin Number 8, Du Quoin Number 9, Du Quoin Number 10, Du Quoin Number 11, Du Quoin Number 12, Pinckneyville Number 1, Pinckneyville Number 2, Pinckneyville Number 3, Pinckneyville Number 4, Pinckneyville Number 5, Pinckneyville Number 6, Pinckneyville Number 7, Pinckneyville Number 8, Sunfield, Swanwick, Tamaroa Number 1, Tamaroa Number 2, and Willisville.

Cities
 Du Quoin
 Pinckneyville

Villages
 Cutler
 St. Johns
 Tamaroa
 Willisville

Unincorporated communities
 Conant
 Denmark
 Denny
 Layfield
 Matthews
 Old Du Quoin
 Pyatts
 Rice
 Sunfield
 Swanwick
 Todds Mill
 Winkle

Politics
Perry County has been reliably Republican county since 2012, when it backed Mitt Romney (R) by nearly 18 points over Illinois native Barack Obama, even as Obama won both Illinois and the country.  By 2020 it was so heavily Republican that incumbent Donald Trump beat Democrat Joe Biden by nearly 45 points in his bid for reelection, even as Biden won the race nationally (and Illinois). The county last voted blue, by a very narrow margin  of 0.6%, in 2000. The table below includes a list of Perry County's election results at the presidential level.

See also
 National Register of Historic Places listings in Perry County

References

 
Illinois counties
Perry County, Illinois
1827 establishments in Illinois
Populated places established in 1827